The Sinjar clashes (2019) refer to a conflict that took place between the Iraqi Army and Kurdistan Worker's Party-affiliated forces in the Sinjar from 17 March to 21 March 2019.

Clashes 
Clashes between Iraqi forces and PKK-affiliated militants began in the Hasawik area of Sinun on 17 March 2019, where two Iraqi soldiers died and five YBŞ miliatans were wounded. The clashes broke out after the militants were denied passage through an army checkpoint and they then attempted to drive through it, driving into one soldier and shooting at the checkpoint.

Additional clashes broke out on 19 March, leaving one Iraqi soldier dead. The fatal clashes took place in Om Diban area, near the Iraq–Syria border, and injuries were reported on both sides in addition to the one death. In Bab Shilo area, Iraq deployed three brigades and demanded that the YBŞ evacuate the area. The YBŞ refused to withdraw and clashes subsequently broke out.

See also 
 Sinjar clashes (2017)
 April 2017 Turkish airstrikes in Syria and Iraq
 Turkish strikes on Sinjar (2018)
 Sinjar clashes (2022)

References 

Islamic State insurgency in Iraq (2017–present)
Conflicts in 2019
March 2019 events in Iraq
Kurdistan Workers' Party attacks
Battles involving Iraq